The Lighthouse of Vale Formoso is a beacon/lighthouse located along the southwestern cliffs of the civil parish of Capelo, in the municipality of Horta, on the Portuguese island of Faial, in the archipelago of the Azores.

History

The lighthouse was constructed to substitute the destroyed lighthouse on the promontory of Capelinhos, following the eruption of the volcano in 1957–1958.

Architecture

It consists of a truncated white circular tower constructed of reinforced contract with gallery and small red beacon on its top. Approximately three storeys tall, each registry is marked by a slitted window, culminating in the top platform with guardrail.

References

Notes

Sources
 
 
 
 
 
 
 
 

Vale Formoso
Buildings and structures in Horta, Azores